The 1945 Campeonato Nacional de Fútbol Profesional was Chilean first tier’s 13th season.  Green Cross was the tournament’s champion, winning its first title.

Scores

Standings

Topscorer

References

External links
ANFP 
RSSSF Chile 1945

Primera División de Chile seasons
Primera
Chile